= BGH (company) =

Argentine electronics company

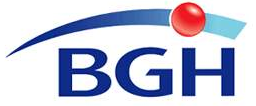
- Type: Private
- Founded: 1913
- Founder: Boris Garfunkel
- Headquarters: Buenos Aires, Argentina

BGH is an Argentine electronics and technology company headquartered in Buenos Aires. It was founded in 1913 by Boris Garfunkel.

== History ==
BGH began as a furniture retailer in Buenos Aires in 1913 and gradually expanded into importing and then manufacturing electrical and electronic goods. By the 2000s it operated large-scale production in Tierra del Fuego, investing to expand capacity for televisions and other consumer electronics.

On 31 July 2007 a major fire destroyed BGH's Río Grande plant. The company rebuilt and reopened a new facility between 2009 and 2011.

In November 2021 BGH and Samsung announced a partnership to manufacture inverter air conditioners in Argentina. As of April 2025, Daniel Rosenfeld serves as BGH's chief executive officer.

== Operations and products ==
BGH manufactures televisions, microwaves, and residential HVAC systems, and also produces for third-party brands from its Río Grande plant. BGH has also marketed innovative microwave models, including a limited “music microwave” edition in 2011.
